Nikos Kalafatis (born 15 March 1982) is a Greek football player who played for Anagennisi Giannitsa F.C. in the Gamma Ethniki. He is the current coach of National Premier Leagues Victoria club Malvern city.

References

1982 births
Living people
Footballers from Kastoria
Greek footballers
Association football defenders
Aiolikos F.C. players
Kalamata F.C. players
Kastoria F.C. players
Korinthos F.C. players